Gen¹³ is a 1998 American animated superhero film based on the Gen¹³ comic book series published by WildStorm Productions which is a part of DC Comics. The film, released in 2000, was directed by Kevin Altieri and produced by WildStorm. The film was distributed by Buena Vista Pictures and first screened for the general public at the Wizard World Chicago convention July 17, 1998.

Plot
College student Caitlin Fairchild is offered a scholarship by the National Security Committee to attend a secret military school set in a U.S. desert base. While there she meets new friends Percival Chang (Grunge) and Roxanne Spaulding (Freefall). Unbeknownst to them, the school's headmasters—Ivana Baiul and Matthew Callahan—are conducting a project known as Gen 13, in which they perform genetic experiments on their pupils in a plot to turn them into super-powered beings ("go Gen Active") and launch an insurrection against the government. The only person in their way is Colonel John Lynch of Internal Operations, an original member of the Gen 12 project who is investigating the Gen 13 project and is determined to expose the headmasters' illegal operations. He introduces himself to Caitlin and mentions that he knew her father, Alex.

While feeling nauseous and searching for the infirmary one night, Caitlin finds a lab and searches through its databases for information on her father, finding out the things he had to put up with as a member of Gen 12. She is joined by Grunge and Roxy, but the three are discovered by a guard. Caitlin displays superhuman abilities and ends up defeating multiple guards so the trio can get away. Grunge and Roxy are soon captured, but Caitlin manages to escape, steal an exo-suit, and return to the base to help rescue her friends. Ivana is convinced that Grunge and Roxy are Lynch's spies and refuses to believe their denials. Soon, she is alerted that Lynch is arriving with a squadron to investigate their illegal activities. Once she leaves, Matthew reveals to Grunge and Roxy that he is psychic and knows that they are telling the truth. He intends to torture them until they go Gen Active or die. Grunge does go Gen Active and gains the power of substance mimicry. He breaks free, knocks out Threshold, and frees Roxy. They kiss afterwards.

After a skirmish with Ivana, the trio intimidates a pilot into flying them home by helicopter as the fighting between Ivana and Lynch's forces rages. Unfortunately, Threshold prevents their escape and destroys the helicopter. Roxy unknowingly engages her gravity-controlling powers and slows their fall. Threshold descends to reveal he intends to overthrow what he believes is a corrupt government that had killed his parents. The trio views him as fanatical and starts to fight him. They defeat him just before Lynch arrives to defuse the situation, and reveals that Caitlin and Threshold are half-siblings. Lynch explains that after learning the NSC was after the two of them, their mother did everything she could to protect them, but when Caitlin's father couldn't help her, she went to her ex-husband Callahan, another member of Gen 12 and Matthew's father. Callahan tried to get them out of the country, however, despite all of his efforts, the NSC killed the both of them and captured Matthew. Lynch couldn't get there in time to save Matthew and his parents, but he found the infant Caitlin, and he returned her to her uncle once the government's SPB program was discontinued. Caitlin realizes her recurring nightmares are repressed memories of that event.

Meanwhile, Ivana sets the base and school to self-destruct. A landslide is caused by the base's destruction and it heads for the gang. With only so little time for them to get away, Threshold sacrifices himself to help his sister escape. Lynch explains to the trio that trying to quit Internal Operations would never end well, but offers to help train them to use their powers to make the world a better place, and Caitlin and her friends accept.

Cast
 Alicia Witt as Caitlin Fairchild
 John de Lancie as Colonel John "Jack" Lynch
 Flea as Edward Chang / Grunge
 Elizabeth Daily as Roxy Spaulding / Freefall
 Mark Hamill as Matthew Callahan / Threshold
 Lauren Lane as Ivana Baiul
 Cloris Leachman as Helga Kleinman
 John De Mita as Stephen Callahan
 Kath Soucie as Rachel

Additional voices by Corey Burton, Julia De Mita, Debi Derryberry, Dave Fennoy, Alex Fernandez, Jamie Hanes, John Hostetter, Mary Kivala, Dakin Matthews, Matt McKenzie, Matt K. Miller, Andy Philpot, Pamela Segall, Mike Sorich, and Ahmet Zappa.

Production
In the mid-1990s, WildStorm owner Jim Lee put his company on the market as comic book sales began to decline. It was during this period that the Walt Disney Studios expressed interest in developing a Gen¹³ film. The film project was already in production when Lee began talks to sell WildStorm to DC Comics, a Time Warner company. The sale was finalized in January 1999. By the time the film was finished, Disney decided to shelve the film because they did not want to market a film with ties to a rival production company. Consequently, the film was never released in the U.S., but did receive a limited video release in Europe and Australia and was aired on the Russian 2×2 channel on August 1, 2010.

References

External links
 

1990s American animated films
1990s science fiction action films
1990s animated superhero films
1998 direct-to-video films
1998 animated films
1998 films
Adult animated superhero films
American independent films
American science fiction action films
Animated teen superhero films
Direct-to-video animated films based on DC Comics
Films based on WildStorm titles
Paramount Pictures animated films
Animated films based on comics
1990s English-language films